The Bad Heart River is a short river in northern Alberta, Canada. It is a tributary of the Smoky River.

Bad Heart River's name is an accurate preservation of its native Cree-language name, maatsiti.

After descending the slopes of the Saddle Hills, it is crossed by Highway 2, then flows north-eastward.

Tributaries
Kakut Creek

See also
Geography of Alberta
List of Alberta rivers

References

Rivers of Alberta